Gulberwick is a village on Mainland,  southwest of Lerwick, Shetland, Scotland, which contains approximately 200 houses. In recent years the number of houses in the area has increased due to its nearness to Shetland's capital and biggest town, Lerwick.

Gulberwick Church is one of the three regular places of worship of the Lerwick and Bressay Parish, the largest Church of Scotland congregation in Shetland.

References

External links

Canmore - Neptunus: Gulber Wick, North Sea site record

Villages in Mainland, Shetland